Victoria Valley is one of the larger McMurdo Dry Valleys in Antarctica. Lake Vida is the largest lake of the valley.

See also
Dry Valleys Geology

Valleys of Victoria Land
McMurdo Dry Valleys